Geneviève Gambillon (born 30 June 1951, in Hudimesnil, Manche) is a former French road bicycle racer. She became the women's Road World Champion in 1972 and again in 1974. She retired from competition in 1978 and became a nurse at the hospital in Granville.

Palmarès 

1969
 French National Road Race Championships
 Sprint, French National Track Championships
 Pursuit, French National Track Championships
1970
 French National Road Race Championships
 Sprint, French National Track Championships
 Pursuit, French National Track Championships
1971
 Sprint, French National Track Championships
 Pursuit, French National Track Championships
2nd French National Road Race Championships
1972
 UCI Road World Championships – Women's road race
 French National Road Race Championships
 Sprint, French National Track Championships
 Pursuit, French National Track Championships
1973
 Sprint, French National Track Championships
 Pursuit, French National Track Championships
3rd French National Road Race Championships
1974
 UCI Road World Championships – Women's road race
 French National Road Race Championships
 Sprint, French National Track Championships
 Pursuit, French National Track Championships
1975
 French National Road Race Championships
 Pursuit, French National Track Championships
2nd UCI Road World Championships – Women's road race
2nd Sprint, French National Track Championships
1976
 French National Road Race Championships
 Sprint, French National Track Championships
 Pursuit, French National Track Championships
1977
 French National Road Race Championships

References

1951 births
French female cyclists
UCI Road World Champions (women)
Sportspeople from Manche
Living people
Cyclists from Normandy